The 1955 BC Lions finished the season in fourth place in the W.I.F.U. with a 5–11 record, improving upon their inaugural season, but still could not qualify for the playoffs.

At the end of the season, Annis Stukus, who help organize and spearhead the new CFL expansion franchise, was dropped as head coach after two seasons.  On December 7, former Ottawa Rough Riders head coach, Clem Crowe, was elevated from assistant to the second head coach in Lions history.

Guard Bob Levenhagen was the only Lion to be a WIFU All-star.

Preseason

Regular season

Season standings

Season schedule

Offensive leaders

1955 Canadian Football Awards
None

References

BC Lions seasons
1955 Canadian football season by team
1955 in British Columbia